Khvorostyanka is the name of several rural localities in Russia:
Khvorostyanka, Belgorod Oblast, a selo in Gubkinsky District of Belgorod Oblast
Khvorostyanka, Dubovskoy Selsoviet, Dobrinsky District, Lipetsk Oblast, a selo in Dubovskoy Selsoviet of Dobrinsky District of Lipetsk Oblast
Khvorostyanka, Khvorostyansky Selsoviet, Dobrinsky District, Lipetsk Oblast, a railway station in Khvorostyansky Selsoviet of Dobrinsky District of Lipetsk Oblast
Khvorostyanka, Kursk Oblast, a village in Lipovsky Selsoviet of Cheremisinovsky District of Kursk Oblast
Khvorostyanka, Moscow Oblast, a village in Znamenskoye Rural Settlement of Kashirsky District of Moscow Oblast
Khvorostyanka, Oryol Oblast, a village in Khvorostyansky Selsoviet of Novosilsky District of Oryol Oblast
Khvorostyanka, Samara Oblast, a selo in Khvorostyansky District of Samara Oblast
Khvorostyanka, Tula Oblast, a village in Ivanovskaya Volost of Kurkinsky District of Tula Oblast